Zdounky is a municipality and village in Kroměříž District in the Zlín Region of the Czech Republic. It has about 2,100 inhabitants.

Administrative parts
Villages of Cvrčovice, Divoky, Lebedov, Nětčice and Těšánky are administrative parts of Zdounky.

History
The first written mention of Zdounky is from 1298.

References

Villages in Kroměříž District